This is a list of NCAA Division I Women's Soccer Championship bids by school, through the 2022 tournament. Schools whose names are italicized are not currently in Division I. The tournament field has included 64 teams since 2001. Previous sizes have been 48 teams (1998–2000), 32 teams (1996–97), 24 teams (1994–95), 16 teams (1993), and 12 to 14 teams (1982–92). Division III teams were eligible for participation from 1982–85, and Division II teams were eligible from 1982–87.

Play-in games were held in 1997, 1999, and 2000. These games are not counted in this list, as the NCAA's record book does not mention them.

Bids

Notes

References

NCAA Division I Women's Soccer Championship